Hwangbo Kwan (born March 1, 1965) is a South Korean football manager and former player.

In the 1990 FIFA World Cup, he recorded a 114 km/h shot on goal against Spain.

Club career 
1988–1995 Yukong Elephants
1995–1998 Oita Trinity

Coach & Manager Career 
 1999 : Oita Trinita & South Korea U-20 Coach
 2000–2003 : Oita Trinita U-18 Manager
 2004 : Oita Trinita Head Coach
 2005 : Oita Trinita Manager
 2010 : Oita Trinita Manager
 2011 : FC Seoul Manager

Award 
 1988 : K-League Rookie of the Year Award

International goals 
Results list South Korea's goal tally first.

Managerial statistics

References

External links
 
 
 

1965 births
Living people
Association football midfielders
South Korean footballers
South Korean expatriate footballers
South Korea international footballers
South Korean football managers
Jeju United FC players
Oita Trinita players
K League 1 players
Japan Football League (1992–1998) players
Expatriate footballers in Japan
J1 League managers
J2 League managers
Oita Trinita managers
FC Seoul managers
K League 1 managers
Expatriate football managers in Japan
1988 AFC Asian Cup players
1990 FIFA World Cup players
Sportspeople from Daegu
South Korean expatriate sportspeople in Japan
Seoul National University alumni
Asian Games medalists in football
Footballers at the 1990 Asian Games
Yeongcheon Hwangbo clan
Asian Games bronze medalists for South Korea
Medalists at the 1990 Asian Games
South Korean expatriate football managers